Bristol Industrial Historic District is a national historic district located at Bristol, Bucks County, Pennsylvania. It encompasses nine contributing buildings in a wholly industrial area of Bristol. It includes the Keystone Mill (1877, 1903), Star Mill (1880), Wilson & Fenimore Walpaper Factory (1882), and Peirce and William Planing Mill (1891).  The district includes the separately listed Grundy Mill Complex and formerly listed  Bristol Carpet Mills.  A number of the buildings were constructed by the Bristol Improvement Company between 1876 and 1885.

It was added to the National Register of Historic Places in 1987.

References

Industrial buildings and structures on the National Register of Historic Places in Pennsylvania
Historic districts in Bucks County, Pennsylvania
Historic districts on the National Register of Historic Places in Pennsylvania
National Register of Historic Places in Bucks County, Pennsylvania